Sayany Airlines was an airline with its headquarters in Irkutsk and with hubs in Chita and Irkutsk.

History
The airline was one of the first non-Aeroflot divided airlines. The airline's fleet consisted mostly from Tupolev Tu-154. In 2001, the contract of the operator of the airline was cancelled, which lead to the destinations ceasing, but the airline completely closed in 2002.

Destinations
Till the airline's closing it operated several routes: 

Beijing - Beijing Capital International Airport 
Harbin - Harbin Taiping International Airport 
Manzhouli - Manzhouli Xijiao Airport 

Blagoveshchensk - Ignatyevo Airport
Irkutsk - International Airport Irkutsk hub
Chara - Chara Airport 
Chita - Kadala Airport hub
Khabarovsk - Khabarovsk Novy Airport
Krasnoyarsk- 
Cheremshanka Airport (till 1999)
Yemelyanovo International Airport
Moscow - 
Domodedovo International Airport
Vnukovo International Airport (till 2000)
Novosibirsk - Tolmachevo Airport
Tomsk - Bogashevo Airport
Vladivostok - Vladivostok International Airport
Ulan-Ude - Mukhino Airport
 
Ulanbaatar - Chinggis Khaan International Airport

Fleet

The Tomskavia fleet included the following aircraft in February 2002:

 1 Antonov An-24 (used for regional flights)
 3 Tupolev Tu-154B-2 (2 to Chitaavia, since 2005 stored in Kadala Airport)
 2 Tupolev Tu-154M (one to Alrosa, one to Atlant-Soyuz Airlines)

References

External links

Airlines established in 1998
Companies based in Irkutsk
Defunct airlines of Russia